Christoph Grillhösl (born 16 November 1978) is a retired German ski jumper.

He finished second overall in the 2000-2001 Continental Cup. In the World Cup he participated in one race, finishing 27th in Willingen in February 2001.

External links

1978 births
Living people
German male ski jumpers